Bhavadevarapalle is a village in Krishna district of Indian state of Andhra Pradesh. It is located in Nagayalanka mandal of Machilipatnam revenue division. It is known for the famous Bhavannarayana Temple. Because of this temple  the village got its name.

References 

Villages in Krishna district